Jaan Miger (also Jaan Migger; 30 January 1859 Tarvastu Parish (now Viljandi Parish), Kreis Fellin – 3 September 1940 Tartu) was an Estonian politician. He was a member of II Riigikogu. He was a member of the Riigikogu since 29 February 1924. He replaced Hendrik Allik. On 8 March 1924, he resigned his position and he was replaced by Mihkel Laar.

References

1859 births
1940 deaths
People from Viljandi Parish
People from Kreis Fellin
Workers' United Front politicians
Members of the Riigikogu, 1923–1926